"The One" is a song written by Karen Manno and Billy Lee and recorded by American country music singer Gary Allan. It was released in January 2002 as the second single from album's 2001 album Alright Guy. The song reached number 3 on the U.S. Billboard Hot Country Singles & Tracks chart. It also entered the Top 40 on the Billboard Hot 100, making this Allan's first Top 40 hit on that chart.

Content
The song is a ballad, in which the narrator offers to wait patiently for the woman he loves to return his affection.

Music video
The accompanying music video for this song was directed by Morgan Lawley and premiered in April 2002. It was filmed on location in on a set in Los Angeles. It features Allan driving in a truck, and with his lover in various places, including a house, flea market, and street corner.

Critical reception
Rick Cohoon of Allmusic gave the song a positive review. He called it "one of [Allan's] most romantic love ballads." He also stated that "without the vocals, the words seem a bit sappy and over-dramatic."

Chart performance
"The One" debuted at number 56 on the U.S. Billboard Hot Country Singles & Tracks for the week of January 19, 2002.

Year-end charts

References

2002 singles
2001 songs
Gary Allan songs
Song recordings produced by Tony Brown (record producer)
MCA Nashville Records singles
Song recordings produced by Mark Wright (record producer)

MCA Records singles